This is a list of nicknames in the sport of basketball in the Philippines. Most are related to professional basketball leagues such as the Philippine Basketball Association, Metropolitan Basketball Association and others, although a few notable nicknames from the University Athletic Association of the Philippines and National Collegiate Athletic Association (Philippines) are included.

Players

A
Aaron Aban - "Triple A" 
Billy Abarrientos - "Haba-Haba" 
Johnny Abarrientos - "The Flying A"
Dylan Ababou - "Super Ababou"
Freddie Abuda - "The Scavenger" 
Calvin Abueva - "The Beast" 
Rommel Adducul - "The General" 
William "Bogs" Adornado - "Mr. Nice Guy" 
Japeth Aguilar - "Jumping Japeth", "The Eagle"
Ato Agustin - "The Atom Bomb" 
Rabeh Al-Hussaini - "Rabehlation" 
Jimmy Alapag - "The Mighty Mouse" 
Kevin Alas - "The Ace Player"
Raymond Almazan - "Rock N' Roll" 
Paul Alvarez - "Mr. Excitement" 
Baser Amer - "The Hammer" 
Dondon Ampalayo - "The Magic Man"  
Mark Andaya - "Big Mac" 
Marlou Aquino - "The Skyscraper" 
Wynne Arboleda - "The Snatcher"
John Arigo - "The Arsenal"
Francis Arnaiz - "Mr. Clutch"
Paul Artadi - "Kid Lightning" 
Nelson Asaytono - "The Bull" 
Leo Austria - The Sariaya Cyclone

B
Gido Babilonia - "Prinsipe K, "The Babylon"
Nonoy Baclao - "Mr. Swat" 
Cyrus Baguio - "Skyrus" 
Bonel Balingit - "Mt. Balingit", "Man Mountain"
Estong Ballesteros - "Estrong"
Jason Ballesteros - "Gagamboy" 
Mac Baracael - "Kalibre 45"
Mark Barroca - "Coffee Prince", "Hotdog Prince", "Star Barroca"
Billy Ray Bates - "Black Superman" 
Felix "Donbel" Belano - "Felix The Cat" 
Nic Belasco - "St. Nic" 
Beau Belga - "Big Beau", "Extra Rice" 
Mac Belo - "Big Mac"
Egay Billones - "Billion Dollar Man"
Norman Black - "That Old Black Magic", "Mr.100%" 
Cris Bolado - "Jumbo", "Lucky Charm"
Ken Bono - "The Fertilizer"
Ricky Brown - "The Quick Brown Fox" 
Ronjay Buenafe - "The Red Dragon"
Paolo Bugia - "The Boogey Man"

C
Alex Cabagnot - "The Crunchman" 
Elmer "Boy" Cabahug - "The Hitman", "The Silencer"
Sonny Cabatu - "Mr. Quality Minutes" 
Brandon Cablay - "Black Cat", "Sky High"
Mark Caguioa - "The Spark", "MC47", "The Furious", "The Blonde Bomber"
Allan Caidic - "The Triggerman" 
Chris Calaguio - "Hot Hands"  
Hector Calma - "The Director" 
Nino Canaleta - "KG"  "Da Vinci of Dunks"
Jeffrey Cariaso - "The Jet" 
Mark Cardona - "Captain Hook" 
Noy Castillo - "The Golden Boy" 
Jayson Castro - "The Blur"
Philip Cezar - "The Scholar", “Mr. Stretch”, "Tapal King" 
Sean Chambers - "Mr. 100%" 
Jeff Chan - "The Negros Sniper" 
Justin Chua - "The Great Wall of Chua" 
Atoy Co - “The Fortune Cookie” 
Jerry Codiñera - "The Defense Minister" 
Jackson Corpuz - "Pinoy Fukuda" 
Mike Cortez - "Cool Cat" 
Carl Bryan Cruz - "CBC"
Jacinto Ciria Cruz - "Jumping Jack"  
Mark Cruz - "The Antman"

D
 Gary David - "El Granada" 
 Bal David - "The Flash" 
Ranidel De Ocampo - "RDO", "Hodor", "Pambansang Siko" 
Anthony "Tony" Dela Cruz - "TDLC"
Maximo "Max" Delantes - "Mad Max" 
Joe Devance - "JDV" 
Yves Dignadice - "Mr. Adonis of PBA"
 Jared Dillinger - "The Daredevil" 
 Rudy Distrito - “The Destroyer” 
Joel Dualan - "El Aparador" 
 Kenneth Duremdes - "Captain Marbel"

E
Chris Ellis - "Air Force Ellis" 
Itoy Esguerra - "Rifleman" 
Dennis Espino - "Dennis the Menace" 
Gerry Esplana - "Mr. Cool"

F
Bernie Fabiosa - "The Sultan of Swipe", "The Fabulous Boholano", "Tough Job" 
June Mar Fajardo - "The Kraken"
Mon Fernandez - "The Franchise", "Money Man", "Don Ramon", "El Presidente"  
Danny Florencio - "Daredevil"   "Daredevil Danny", "Deadly D" , "Dangerous Danny", "Daring Danny" 
Larry Fonacier - "The Baby-faced Assassin"

G 

 Matt Ganuelas-Rosser - "Black Panther" "The Manager"
 Jayvee Gayoso - "Mr. Adrenaline" 
Willie Generalao - "The Little General" 
Isaac Go - "The Big Chill"
Wesley Gonzales - "Wild Wild Wes"
Dante Gonzalgo - "Iron Man"
Joey Guanio - "Cha -Cha"
Rey Guevarra - "Papa Rey"

H
Tony Harris - "The Hurricane" 
Rudy Hatfield - "The H-Bomb" 
Bong Hawkins - "The Hawk" 
Jayjay Helterbrand - "The Fast", "Helter Skelter" 
Vince Hizon - "The Prince" 
Dondon Hontiveros - "The Cebuano Hotshot" 
Maui Huelar - "Flying Fish"

I
Danny Ildefonso - "Lakay", “Demolition Man” 
JC Intal - "The Rocket"

J
Chris Jackson - "Stonewall" 
Pido Jarencio - "The Fireman"
Robert Jaworski - "Big J", "The Living Legend", "Sonny"
Jio Jalalon -  "Cyclone", "The Bus Driver" 
Bobby Jose - "The Firecracker"

K

L
 Garvo Lanete - "Gabo"
 Marcio Lassiter - "Super Marcio" 
Jojo Lastimosa - "Jolas", "4th Quarterman", "Mr. Clutch" 
 Paul Lee - "Lethal Weapon" ,"Ang Angas ng Tondo", "Leethal Star", 
 Samboy Lim - "The Sky Walker", "The Dragon" 
 Jun Limpot - "The Main Man", "The Big Deal"
 Rudy Lingganay - "Anay" 
Renato Lobo - "Etok" 
 Noli Locsin - "The Tank" 
Caloy Loyzaga - "The Big Difference" 
Chito Loyzaga - "The Dynamite"

M
Ronnie Magsanoc - "The Point Laureate" 
Romulo "Romy" Mamaril - "Mama" 
Jett Manuel - "Gingineer"
Vic Manuel - "The Muscle Man"
Dave Marcelo - "Dave Gwapo"
Ronnie Matias - "Batas ni Matias"
Justin Melton - "QuickMelt", "Flying Minion"
Eric Menk - “Major Pain”, "Sgt. Rock" 
Vergel Meneses - "The Aerial Voyager" 
Joey Mente - "Kuryente" 
Sol Mercado - "Sol Train" 
Willie Miller - "The Thriller" 
Emman Monfort - "The Minion"
Kib Montalbo - "Man of Steal" 
Rafael Morales - "Baby Boy" 
Lauro Mumar - "The Fox"

N
Gabe Norwood - "Mr. President" 
Rey Nambatac - " Stingrey "

P
Manny Pacquiao - "Pacman"
Victor Pablo - "The Conqueror"
Jun Papa - "Deadshot Rifleman"
Benjie Paras - "The Tower of Power", "Dunkin' Donato"
Alvin Patrimonio - "The Captain", "Captain Lion Heart" 
Ali Peek - "Man Mountain" 
CJ Perez - "Baby Beast", "The Predator"
Mick Pennisi - "The Slick" & "Big Daddy P", "Mr. Flop"
Dorian Peña - "The Big Dawg" 
Jason Perkins - "Hefty Lefty" 
Marc Pingris - "Pinoy Sakuragi" 
Stanley Pringle - "Stan The Man" 
Dindo Pumaren - “The Bullet”

R
Francisco Rabat - "Rajah of Rebounds" 
Kevin Racal - "K-Racs" 
Olsen Racela - "Ra-Ra-Racela" 
Bong Ravena - "The Raven" 
Kiefer Ravena - "The Phenom" 
Kerby Raymundo- "The Kid"
Rafi Reavis - "The Ostrich"
Aldrich Reyes - "Moking" 
Alberto Reynoso - "Big Boy" 
Billy Ray Robles - "Ilonggo Superman" 
Topex Robinson - "The Pitbull"
Oscar Rocha - "The Bad Boy" 
Terrence Romeo - "The Bro", "Swaggy T" 
Renren Ritualo - "The Rainman" 
Troy Rosario - "The Terminator "

Q
J.R. Quinahan - other half of "Extra Rice, Inc.", with Beau Belga, "Baby Shaq"

S
Sunday Salvacion - "Sunday's Special"
Terry Saldana - "The Plastic Man"
Kent Salado - "Conductor" 
Arwind Santos - "The Spiderman" 
Rodney Santos - "The Slasher"
Danny Seigle - "Dynamite" 
Oscar "Biboy" Simon - "The Assassin" 
Herminio Silva - "Herr" Silva 
Peter June Simon - "The Scoring Apostle" 
Greg Slaughter - "Gregzilla"
Christian Standhardinger - "The Bulldozer"
Rudy Soriano - "Magic Man" 
Roi Sumang - "Super Sumang"

T
Asi Taulava - "The Rock", "Ageless Rock"
Moala Tautuaa - "Big Mo"  "Pebbles"
Alvin Teng - "RoboCop" 
Jeron Teng - "Intengsity", 
LA Tenorio - "The Lieutenant", "Teniente, "The Gineral", "Ironman Of PBA",
Scottie Thompson - "The Hustle Man"
Sonny Thoss - "The Boss" 
Ritchie Ticzon - "The Velvet Touch"
Arvin Tolentino - "A-Train"
Chester Tolomia - "Elevator"
Jimwell Torion - "Tora-Tora"
Norbert Torres - "The Bear"  
Ronald Tubid - "The Saint", "The Fearless"
Lordy Tugade - "The Alaminos Assassin"

U
Josh Urbiztondo - "The Fireball"

V
Junthy Valenzuela - "Hitman"
Luis "Tito" Varela - "Kojak" 
Arnold Van Opstal - "AVO"
Emmanuel Victoria - "Boybits", "Boy Bitin" 
Yoyoy Villamin- “Bicolano Superman” 
Enrico Villanueva - "The Raging Bull", "E.Vill"

W
Jay Washington - "J-Wash"
Freddie Webb - "Fastbreak Freddie" 
Matthew Wright - "Mr. Wright"
William Wilson - "Double W"
Kelly Williams - "Machine Gun Kelly"

Y
James Yap - "Big Game James", "The Man With A Million Moves" 
Roger Yap - "Roger Rabbit"
Joseph Yeo - "The Ninja"

Coaches
Virgilio "Baby" Dalupan - "Maestro"

Sportscasters and other personalities 
Ramon Ang - "RSA"
Quinito Henson - "The Dean"
Joe Cantada - "Smokin' Joe"
Andy Jao - "Dr. J" 
Manny Pangilinan - "MVP"
Randy Sacdalan - "The Professor"

Tandems 

Beau Belga and JR Quiñahan - "Extra Rice, Inc."
Mark Caguioa and Jayjay Helterbrand - "The Fast and the Furious"
Jio Jalalon and Kent Salado - "The Bus Driver and the Conductor"
Ricky Relosa and Yoyoy Villamin - "Bruise Brothers"
Terrence Romeo and Stanley Pringle - "Slash Brothers"

Teams

Collegiate 
1950 Letran Knights - "Murder, Inc."
Ateneo–UP rivalry - "The Battle of Katipunan"
Ateneo–La Salle rivalry - "The Mother of all Rivalries"
FEU–UE rivalry - "The Battle of the East / Battle of Morayta"
Letran–Mapua rivalry - "The Battle of Intramuros"
UP–UST rivalry - "Battle of the Church and State"
Ateneo–Adamson rivalry- "Battle of the Birds"

Professional
Alaska Aces - "The Team of the 90's", "#WeNotMe"
Barangay Ginebra San Miguel - "Brgy. Ginebra", "NSD (Never-Say-Die)"
Ginebra–Purefoods rivalry - "Manila Clasico"
Purefoods–Rain or Shine rivalry - "New-age Rivalry", "KontraPelo"

National teams 

 1936 men's Summer Olympics team - "The Islanders"
 1992 men's Asian Games team - "The Philippine Dream Team"
 1998 men's Asian Games team - "The Philippine Centennial Team"
 2016 men's Asian Games team - "GilastoPainters"
 Men's junior national basketball team - "Batang Gilas"
 Men's national basketball team - "Gilas"
 Men's national basketball "B" team - "Gilas Cadets" / "Sinag"
 Women's junior national basketball team - "Batang Perlas"
 Women's national basketball team - "Perlas" / "Gilas Women"

Locations 
Smart Araneta Coliseum - The Big Dome
PhilSports Arena - The ULTRA

Leagues

 National Collegiate Athletic Association (Philippines) - "The Grand Old League"

Items 

 Jun Bernardino Trophy - "The Perpetual Trophy"
 Philippine Basketball Association player awards - "The Leo"

See also
Nickname
List of athletes by nickname
Lists of nicknames – nickname list articles on Wikipedia

References

Nickname

Basketball
Sports culture in the Philippines